Admiral Arthur Duncombe (24 March 1806 – 6 February 1889) was a British naval commander and Conservative politician.

Background
Duncombe was a younger son of Charles Duncombe, 1st Baron Feversham, and his wife Lady Charlotte, daughter of William Legge, 2nd Earl of Dartmouth.

Career
Duncombe served in the Royal Navy and achieved the rank of admiral. Apart from his naval career he also sat as Member of Parliament for East Retford between 1830 and 1831 and 1835 and 1852 and the East Riding of Yorkshire between 1852 and 1868. He served in the short-lived 1852 Conservative administration of the Earl of Derby as a Fourth Naval Lord.

Duncombe lived at Kilnwick Percy Hall at Pocklington in the East Riding of Yorkshire. He was selected as High Sheriff of Yorkshire for 1874–75.

Family
He married firstly Delia, daughter of John Wilmer Field, in 1836. Their eldest son, Charles Wilmer Duncombe, was a Major-General in the Army; their second son Arthur Duncombe was also a politician; while their fourth and youngest son George Augustus Duncombe was created a baronet in 1919 (see Duncombe baronets). After Delia's death in 1873 he married secondly Jane Maria, daughter of Sir James Walker, 1st Baronet. Duncombe's second wife died in August 1917. He himself died in February 1889, aged 82.

See also

References

External links 
 

|-

1806 births
1889 deaths
Conservative Party (UK) MPs for English constituencies
Lords of the Admiralty
Royal Navy admirals
UK MPs 1830–1831
UK MPs 1835–1837
UK MPs 1837–1841
UK MPs 1841–1847
UK MPs 1847–1852
UK MPs 1852–1857
UK MPs 1857–1859
UK MPs 1859–1865
UK MPs 1865–1868
Younger sons of barons
Arthur
High Sheriffs of Yorkshire